Barry Parker is a former professional rugby league footballer who played in the 1970s.

Playing career

County Cup Final appearances
Barry Parker played , i.e. number 5, in Wakefield Trinity's 2-7 defeat by Leeds in the 1973 Yorkshire County Cup Final during the 1973–74 season at Headingley Rugby Stadium, Leeds on Saturday 20 October 1973.

References

External links
Search for "Parker" at rugbyleagueproject.org

Living people
Year of birth missing (living people)
Place of birth missing (living people)
Rugby league wingers
English rugby league players
Wakefield Trinity players